Gwaltney is a surname. Notable people with the surname include:

Francis Irby Gwaltney (1921–1981) American author
John Langston Gwaltney (1928–1998), African-American writer and anthropologist 
Sheila Gwaltney (born 1954), American diplomat
Tommy Gwaltney (1921–2003), American jazz musician

See also
Gwaltney Foods, a brand of Smithfield Foods